Helen Wills successfully defended her title, defeating Helen Jacobs in the final, 6–1, 6–2 to win the ladies' singles tennis title at the 1929 Wimbledon Championships.

Seeds

  Helen Wills (champion)
  Lilí de Álvarez (fourth round) 
  Betty Nuthall (third round)
  Eileen Bennett (fourth round)
  Helen Jacobs (final)
  Bobbie Heine (quarterfinals)
  Simonne Mathieu (third round)
  Cilly Aussem (fourth round)

Draw

Finals

Top half

Section 1

Section 2

Section 3

Section 4

Bottom half

Section 5

Section 6

Section 7

Section 8

References

External links

Women's Singles
Wimbledon Championship by year – Women's singles
Wimbledon Championships - singles
Wimbledon Championships - singles